Peter of Luxembourg (1390 – 31 August 1433) was a son of John of Luxembourg, Lord of Beauvoir, and his wife Marguerite of Enghien. His inheritance included the counties of Brienne, Conversano and Saint-Pol.

Family 
Peter had succeeded his father, John of Luxembourg, Lord of Beauvoir, and mother, Marguerite of Enghien. They had co-reigned as Count and Countess of Brienne from 1394 to her death in 1397. His name originates from the fact that he was a 6th generation descendant of Henry V, Count of Luxembourg, and thus belonged to the French branch of the House of Luxembourg.

Life 
Peter succeeded his aunt Jeanne of Luxembourg, Countess of Saint-Pol and Ligny, as Count of Saint-Pol in 1430.

On 8 May 1405, Peter married Margaret de Baux, the daughter of Francis of Baux and his third wife Sueva Orsini. Peter and Margaret had:

 Louis of Luxembourg, Count of Saint-Pol, de Brienne, de Ligny, and Conversano, Constable of France (1418 – 19 December 1475), married firstly, in 1435, Jeanne de Bar, Countess of Marle and Soissons (1415 – 14 May 1462). He married secondly, Marie of Savoy (20 March 1448 – 1475), by whom he had issue. He was beheaded in Paris in 1475 for treason against King Louis XI.
 Jacquetta of Luxembourg (1415/1416 – 30 May 1472), married firstly in 1433, John, Duke of Bedford, and secondly, c.1436, Richard Woodville, 1st Earl Rivers
 Thibaud of Luxembourg, Seigneur de Fiennes, Count of Brienne, Bishop of Le Mans, (died 1 September 1477), married Philippa de Melun, by whom he had issue.
 Jacques of Luxembourg, Seigneur de Richebourg (1426-1487), married Isabelle de Roubaix, by whom he had issue.
 Valeran of Luxembourg, died young.
 Jean of Luxembourg, died in Africa.
 Catherine of Luxembourg (died 1492), married Arthur III, Duke of Brittany (24 August 1393 – 26 December 1458)
 Isabelle of Luxembourg, Countess of Guise (died 1472), married in 1443, Charles, Count of Maine (1414–1472),

Death 
The Black Death had hit Luxembourg, France, England and Spain in the 1340s when it caused the deaths of millions of people; and it continued to re-appear at intervals over the succeeding centuries.  Peter was among its victims. He died at Rambures on 31 August 1433, aged 43 years, and was buried in the abbey at Cercamp, near Frévent. His wife died 36 years later.

References

Sources

1390 births
1433 deaths
House of Luxembourg
Counts of Brienne
Counts of Saint-Pol
Counts of Conversano
People of the Hundred Years' War
15th-century deaths from plague (disease)
Knights of the Golden Fleece
Burgundian knights